Trihedral Neolithic is a name given by archaeologists to a style (or industry) of striking spheroid and trihedral flint tools  from the archaeological site of Joub Jannine II in the Beqaa Valley, Lebanon. The style appears to represent a highly specialized Neolithic industry. Little comment has been made of this industry.

References

Archaeological cultures of West Asia
Neolithic cultures of Asia
Archaeological cultures in Lebanon
Lithics